Athletics events were contested at the 1979 Summer Universiade in Mexico City, Mexico between 8 and 13 September.

Medal summary

Men's events

Women's events

Medal table

References
World Student Games (Universiade - Men) - GBR Athletics
World Student Games (Universiade - Women) - GBR Athletics

 
Athletics at the Summer Universiade
Uni
1979 Summer Universiade